Uganda women's national basketball team is the national basketball team representing Uganda at world basketball competitions for women.

It is administrated by the Federation of Uganda Basketball Association (FUBA).

Team

Current roster
Roster for the 2023 Women's Afrobasket qualification.

See also
Uganda women's national under-19 basketball team
Uganda women's national 3x3 team

References

External links
Official website
FIBA profile
Uganda Basketball Records at FIBA Archive

 
Women's national basketball teams